Cartieraspis is an extinct genus of Phlyctaeniid placoderm fish which lived during the Middle Devonian period in North America. Whether or not it is morphologically different enough from its close relative and contemporary Phlyctaenius to be considered generically distinct is  dubious.

References

Placoderms of North America
Phlyctaeniidae
Middle Devonian animals